Barsebäck is a locality situated in Kävlinge Municipality, Skåne County, Sweden with 524 inhabitants in 2010.

It lies about 4 km east of the harbour village Barsebäckshamn. It is known for the now closed Barsebäck Nuclear Power Plant, and for the internationally known golf course Barsebäck Golf & Country Club with an annual world class golf tournament.

References

External links

Populated places in Kävlinge Municipality
Populated places in Skåne County